Taraxacin is a guaianolide with the molecular formula C15H14O3 which has been isolated from the plant Taraxacum officinale. Taraxacin has a bitter taste. Taraxacin has diuretic properties.

References

Further reading 

 
 

Furanones
Heterocyclic compounds with 3 rings
Cyclopentenes
Ketones